Edmund Knapp (24 April 1917 – 19 February 1989) was a New Zealand cricketer. He played in four first-class matches for Wellington from 1943 to 1945.

See also
 List of Wellington representative cricketers

References

External links
 

1917 births
1989 deaths
New Zealand cricketers
Wellington cricketers
Cricketers from Greymouth